Dzhamilli Vtoryye (also, Dzhamilli) is a village in the Tartar Rayon of Azerbaijan.

This village is in an area occupied by the self-proclaimed Nagorno-Karabakh Republic. It is suspected that this village has undergone a name change or no longer exists, as no Azerbaijani website mentions it under this name.

References 

Populated places in Tartar District